André Labat (28 November 1889 – 8 October 1946) was a French athlete. He competed in the men's high jump at the 1912 Summer Olympics.

References

1889 births
1946 deaths
Athletes (track and field) at the 1912 Summer Olympics
French male high jumpers
Olympic athletes of France
Place of birth missing
20th-century French people